Kepler star may refer to:
 Kepler Object of Interest, a star observed by the Kepler spacecraft which is suspected of hosting one or more transiting planets
 Kepler's Supernova, a supernova that occurred in the Milky Way, observed by the naked eye in 1604
 Small or great stellated dodecahedron, geometric solids; see Kepler–Poinsot polyhedron